Yash Nahar (born 10 October 1994) is an Indian cricketer. A right handed opening batter, he represents Maharashtra in domestic cricket.

Career
Nahar made his Twenty20 debut for Maharashtra in the 2018–19 Syed Mushtaq Ali Trophy on 21 February 2019. He made his List A debut on 21 February 2021, for Maharashtra in the 2020–21 Vijay Hazare Trophy. He made his first-class debut on 17 February 2022, for Maharashtra in the 2021–22 Ranji Trophy.

References

External links
 

1994 births
Living people
Indian cricketers
Maharashtra cricketers
Place of birth missing (living people)